Sheetla Mata Temple  is a Hindu temple dedicated to the goddess  Shitala (Sheetla), wife of Guru Dronacharya who was the teacher of the Pandavas and Kauravas according to an Indian epic Mahabharata. The temple is located on Sheetla Mata Road in Gurugram (earlier known as Gurgaon) city of Gurugram district in the state of Haryana in India.

The shrine is very famous and is visited by large number of people during Navaratri and other festivals.

History
The Sheetla Mata temple is dedicated to the wife of Guru Dronacharya, Kripi (Kirpai), also called Lalitha.
 
Kirpai, also called Lalita and later Mata Sheetla, used to live in Keshopur village located in the nearby Union Territory of Delhi. Dronacharya her husband used to visit her daily at Keshopur from his Gurugram ashram.

She devoted herself to look after the sick children, specially those suffering from the smallpox. People called her Mata (Mother) out of affection and respect. After her death a temple was built in her honour by the villagers and she began to be remembered as Mata Sitla or Mata Masani, i.e. 'the goddess of smallpox'.

It is said that more than three centuries ago, Masani Mother appeared in a dream to Chaudhri Singh Ram alias Singha, a Jat of village Gurugram. She expressed her desire to leave Keshopur and come to Gurugram. She made him build a place for her.

Towards the south of Gurugram village lies Gurugram Bhim Kund near the temple of Dronacharya. Sheetla mata temple lies to the north of Gurugram village.

The legend goes that even after Singha had brought and installed the goddess Masani, after her own heart's desire, at village Gurugram, the residents of Keshopur continued to dispute the claims of Gurugram folks. This controversy was put at rest during the time of Begum Samru, the Governor of Jharsa under the Mughals. Her child who had contracted smallpox was cured after being consecrated in the prescribed manner before the goddess Masani at Gurugram. It was then finally established that the goddess had begun to live at village Gurugram.

The current temple was built in the 18th century by the Hindu Jat  king Jawahar Singh of Bharatpur, in memory of his victory over the Mughals, for which he had invoked the blessings of Sheetla Mata.

Reaching to the shrine in Gurugram 
Gurugram is one of the districts in the state of Haryana which is located in the Northern part of India. The district is located southwest of the national capital Delhi and is part of the national capital region. The city of Gurugram is well connected by road, metro, rail and air transport. Public transport is available to the Shrine but direct connectivity is not available with some modes of transport.

By Road 
Nearest proximity from National Highway 8   is around 6 km. Intercity buses, private cabs and autos ply to the shrine within the city.

By Rail 
Delhi Metro

The nearest railway station is Huda City Metro Station which is 6.6 km from the shrine. Earlier there was no direct connectivity of public transport available to the shrine from the metro station.

Indian Railways

The nearest railway station is Gurugram Railway Station which is 2.7 km from the shrine. There is a direct connectivity by auto rickshaw available to the shrine from the railway station at regular intervals. Iffco Chowk metro station is nearby.

By Air 
The nearest airport is Indira Gandhi International Airport (IGI) at New Delhi, which is about 17 km from Sheetla Mata Mandir, Gurugram. Intercity buses and private cabs ply to the shrine from the airport but there is no direct connectivity.

Other attractions nearby

Gurugram Bhim Kund

Gurugram Bhim Kund (Hindi: गुरुग्राम भीम कुंड), also known as Pinchokhda Jhod (Hindi: पिंचोखड़ा जोहड़), is a 10-acre wetland in Bhim Nagar locality of Gurugram city of Gurugram district in the state of Haryana in India. It lies between sector 4, 6 and 8 about 3 km from Rajiv Chowk, Gurugram.

Eklavya temple

There is an Eklavya temple (Hindi: एकलव्य मंदिर) temple in honor of Mahabharata fame Eklavya in Khandsa village in Sector 37 of Gurugram city in Haryana state of India. As per folklore, this is the only temple of Eklavya and it is the place where Eklavya cut his thumb and offered to Guru Drona. Locals want the government to develop a tourism circuit in honour of Drona and Eklavya.

References

Hindu temples in Haryana
Villages in Gurgaon district
Tourist attractions in Haryana